Le Fossat is a commune in the Ariège department in southwestern France.

Geography 
The Lèze flows northwest through the middle of the commune and crosses the village.

Population

See also
Communes of the Ariège department

References

Communes of Ariège (department)
Ariège communes articles needing translation from French Wikipedia